Beyg Bolaghi may refer to:
 Beyg Bolaghi, Hashtrud
 Beyg Bolaghi, Meyaneh